Robert Dutton (born 9 October 1957) is a former Australian rules footballer who played with Carlton and Hawthorn in the Victorian Football League (VFL). After his VFL career concluded, he moved back to his home state of Tasmania and played for Clarence.

Notes

External links 

Robert Dutton's profile at Blueseum

1957 births
Carlton Football Club players
Hawthorn Football Club players
Launceston Football Club players
Australian rules footballers from Tasmania
Living people
Clarence Football Club players